Miranova Place is an office and condominiums complex in Columbus, Ohio. The complex was completed in 2001. It consists of Miranova Condominiums and Miranova Corporate Tower, located at 1 and 2 Miranova Place respectively. The buildings were designed by the architectural firm Arquitectonica and constructed in the modern architectural style.

See also
List of tallest buildings in Columbus, Ohio

References
Emporis
Skyscraperpage: Miranova Condominiums
Skyscraperpage: Miranova Corporate Tower
,

External links
 

 Skyscraper office buildings in Columbus, Ohio
 Residential skyscrapers in Columbus, Ohio
 Office buildings completed in 2001
Buildings in downtown Columbus, Ohio
Arquitectonica buildings